Mandeville is a settlement in the Southland region of the South Island of New Zealand.

Mandeville is 17 km north west of Gore.  Dunedin and Invercargill are the nearest cities.

Mandeville is part of the wider Waikaka statistical area.

See also
 Mandeville Aerodrome
 Croydon Aircraft Company

References

External links
 Gore District Council
 Google Map

Populated places in Southland, New Zealand